Alexander "Sandy" Archibald (23 November 1896 – 29 November 1946) was a Scottish footballer, who played for Raith Rovers, Rangers and Scotland. He was later secretary/manager of Raith and Dunfermline Athletic.

Playing career

Club
Initially employed as a miner in Fife, Archibald became a full professional when he joined Rangers at the age of 19 from Raith Rovers in 1917. He made his debut in a 2–0 defeat to Old Firm rivals Celtic in the Glasgow Merchants Charity Cup final in May 1917. The following season he was an ever-present as Rangers won the League title for the first time in five seasons.

Archibald went on to win thirteen league titles in his seventeen seasons with the Glasgow club. He also won three Scottish Cup medals, the first of which in 1928 was Rangers' first in 25 years and Archibald scored twice in the final as Rangers defeated Celtic 4–0 at Hampden. His final appearance was in a 1–1 draw away to Queen's Park on 30 April 1934. He made 625 appearances for Rangers in all competitions.

International
Archibald won a total of 8 caps for Scotland over an 11-year period, although most of his selections occurred between his 1921 debut and 1924. After a seven-year hiatus, he earned a recall for the matches against England in 1931 and 1932. He scored once for his country, against Wales in February 1922. Archibald also played for the Scottish League XI.

Managerial career
After his playing retirement he rejoined Raith Rovers as secretary/manager, a role he held for over five years. He joined the Kirkcaldy side's Fife rivals Dunfermline in October 1939 and performed a similar combined managerial role for them until his death in 1946.

See also
List of footballers in Scotland by number of league appearances (500+)

References

External links

1896 births
1946 deaths
Scottish footballers
Scotland international footballers
Raith Rovers F.C. players
Rangers F.C. players
Scottish football managers
Dunfermline Athletic F.C. managers
Raith Rovers F.C. managers
Scottish Football League players
Scottish Junior Football Association players
Scottish Football League representative players
Association football outside forwards
Scottish Football League managers
Scotland wartime international footballers
Footballers from Fife